Orco Feglino is a comune (municipality) in the Province of Savona in the Italian region Liguria, located about  southwest of Genoa and about  southwest of Savona in the upper valley of the Aquila stream. It consists of the two villages of Orco and Feglino.

Orco Feglino borders the following municipalities: Calice Ligure, Finale Ligure, Mallare, Quiliano and Vezzi Portio.

History
The two burghs were part of the Marca Aleramica in the 10th, and in 1091 they became possession of Boniface del Vasto and, from 1142, of the Del Carretto family, who built a castle in Orco.

In the 16th century it was acquired by Spain, to which it belonged until 1713, when it passed under the Republic of Genoa. Later it was part of the Kingdoms of Sardinia and Italy.

Main sights
Remains of the castle of Orco
Church of San Lorenzino (12th–14th centuries), with frescoes from the 15th and 16th centuries. The bell tower, with two orders of mullioned windows, is from the 14th century.
Baroque church of San Lorenzo, in the frazione of Feglino.

Population trend

Twin towns — sister cities
Orco Feglino is twinned with:

  Le Crestet, France

References

Cities and towns in Liguria